The 1995–96 NBA season was the Timberwolves' 7th season in the National Basketball Association. This season is most memorable when the Timberwolves selected high school basketball star Kevin Garnett with the fifth overall pick in the 1995 NBA draft. The team also signed free agent All-Star guard Terry Porter, and re-signed former T-Wolves forward Sam Mitchell during the off-season. The Timberwolves got off to a bad start losing nine of their first ten games, as head coach Bill Blair was fired after a 6–14 start and was replaced with Flip Saunders, while Michael Williams was out for the rest of the season with a left heel injury after just nine games. 

At midseason, the team traded Christian Laettner and Sean Rooks to the Atlanta Hawks in exchange for Andrew Lang and Spud Webb, as the team re-acquired second-year guard Darrick Martin after a brief stint with the expansion Vancouver Grizzlies. After holding a 13–32 record at the All-Star break, and despite posting an 8–8 record in March, the Timberwolves lost their final six games, and finished fifth in the Midwest Division with a 26–56 record, missing the playoffs for the seventh consecutive season.

Isaiah Rider continued to lead the T-Wolves in scoring with 19.6 points per game, while Tom Gugliotta provided the team with 16.2 points, 8.8 rebounds and 1.8 steals per game, and Mitchell contributed 10.8 points per game. In addition, Garnett averaged 10.4 points, 6.3 rebounds and 1.6 blocks per game, was named to the NBA All-Rookie Second Team, and finished in sixth place in Rookie of the Year voting, while Porter provided with 9.4 points and 5.5 assists per game, and Doug West contributed 6.4 points per game.

Following the season, Rider, who dealt with off-the-court troubles, was traded to the Portland Trail Blazers, while Lang was traded to the Milwaukee Bucks, Martin signed with the Los Angeles Clippers, and Webb was released to free agency.

Offseason

NBA Draft

Kevin Garnett
In Garnett's rookie season, the Timberwolves were in the midst of a transition phase; they replaced Bill Blair with Flip Saunders as head coach early in the season and made several trades. Garnett initially came off the bench in his rookie year, but moved into the starting lineup soon after Saunders became head coach. In his rookie year, Garnett and fellow newcomer Tom Gugliotta carried the scoring load. Garnett did not immediately leap to stardom as later prep-to-pro prospects such as Amar'e Stoudemire, LeBron James, and Dwight Howard would, but he did have a very respectable rookie year. He averaged 10.4 points, 6.3 rebounds, 1.8 assists, and 1.6 blocks per game and was voted into the NBA All-Rookie Second Team. Despite having some promising players, the Timberwolves suffered through their seventh consecutive sub-30 win season and failed to make the playoffs. At the time Garnett was the youngest NBA player in history at 19 years and 11 months of age.

Roster

Regular season

Season standings

Record vs. opponents

Game log

Player statistics

Awards and honors
 Kevin Garnett, NBA All-Rookie Second Team

Transactions

References

 Minnesota Timberwolves on Database Basketball
 Minnesota Timberwolves on Basketball Reference

Minnesota Timberwolves seasons
Timber
Timber
Monnesota